Firor is a surname. Notable people with the surname include:

Anne Firor Scott (1921–2019), American historian
John W. Firor (1927–2007), American physicist
Matt Firor, American video game producer and designer

See also
Firer